Crabronina is a subtribe of square-headed wasps in the family Crabronidae. There are at least 1,300 described species in Crabronina.

Genera

 Alinia Antropov, 1993
 Arnoldita Pate, 1948
 Chimila Pate, 1944
 Chimiloides Leclercq, 1951
 Crabro Fabricius, 1775
 Crorhopalum Tsuneki, 1984
 Crossocerus Lepeletier de Saint Fargeau & Brullé, 1835
 Dasyproctus Lepeletier de Saint Fargeau and Brullé, 1835
 Echucoides Leclercq, 1957
 Ectemnius Dahlbom, 1845
 Enoplolindenius Rohwer, 1911
 Eupliloides Pate, 1946
 Foxita Pate, 1942
 Hingstoniola Turner and Waterston, 1926
 Holcorhopalum Cameron, 1904
 Huacrabro Leclercq, 2000
 Huavea Pate, 1948
 Isorhopalum Leclercq, 1963
 Krombeinictus Leclercq, 1996
 Leclercqia Tsuneki, 1968
 Lecrenierus Leclercq, 1977
 Lestica Billberg, 1820
 Lindenius Lepeletier de Saint Fargeau and Brullé, 1835
 Minicrabro Leclercq, 2003
 Moniaecera Ashmead, 1899
 Neodasyproctus Arnold, 1926
 Notocrabro Leclercq, 1951
 Odontocrabro Tsuneki, 1971
 Pae Pate, 1944
 Papurus Tsuneki, 1983
 Parataruma Kimsey, 1982
 Pericrabro Leclercq, 1954
 Piyuma Pate, 1944
 Piyumoides Leclercq, 1963
 Podagritoides Leclercq, 1957
 Podagritus Spinola, 1851
 Pseudoturneria Leclercq, 1954
 Quexua Pate, 1942
 Rhopalum Stephens, 1829
 Tracheliodes A. Morawitz, 1866
 Tsunekiola Antropov, 1986
 Vechtia Pate, 1944
 Williamsita Pate, 1947
 Zutrhopalum Leclercq, 1998

References

Further reading

External links

 NCBI Taxonomy Browser, Crabronina

Crabronidae